Nadia Al-Hindi (born February 8, 1972) is a Jordanian Olympic table tennis player. She represented Jordan in 1992 Summer Olympics in Barcelona. She is now a member of the CEO of Jordan Tennis Federation.

Olympic participation

Barcelona 1992
Al-Hindi was the youngest and the only female participant for Jordan in that tournament aged 20 years and 173 days then.

Table tennis – Women's Singles – Preliminary Round

References

External links

1972 births
Living people
Table tennis players at the 1992 Summer Olympics
Jordanian female table tennis players
Olympic table tennis players of Jordan
Arab people of Indian descent
India–Jordan relations